The bibliography of Muhammad Taqi Usmani includes books, translations, commentaries, articles written by Pakistani Muslim jurist and scholar Muhammad Taqi Usmani. Usmani is an authority in Islamic finance, law and scholarship.

Usmani has written more than 143 books in Arabic, English and Urdu. He is the chief-editor of Al-Balagh, a monthly journal of Darul Uloom Karachi. His books include Takmilat Fatḥ al-mulhim, Uṣūl al-iftā’ wa-ādābuhu, An Introduction to Islamic Finance, The Meanings of the Noble Qur'an with explanatory notes, Islam aur Jidat Pasandi and Zikr-o-Fikr.

Arabic works
 Buḥūth fī qaḍāya fiqhīyah mu‘āṣirah.
 Fiqh al-buyū‘ ‘alá al-madhāhib al-arba‘ah.
 Maqālāt al-‘Uthmānī
 Takmilat Fatḥ al-mulhim bi-sharḥ Ṣaḥīḥ al-Imām Muslim. Six-volume supplement completing Shabbir Ahmad Usmani's unfinished commentary on Sahih Muslim. Usmani began writing this work in 1977 and completed it in 1994. This work has forewords by Abd al-Fattah Abu Ghudda, Yusuf al-Qaradawi, Muhammad Mukhtar al-Sallami, and Abul Hasan Ali Nadwi.
 Uṣūl al-iftā’ wa-ādābuhu.

English works
 An Introduction to Islamic Finance
 Causes and Remedies of the Present Financial Crisis from Islamic Perspective. 
 Contemporary Fataawa
 Islamic Months: Merits and Precepts
 The Authority of Sunnah
 The Historic Judgment on Interest Delivered in the Supreme Court of Pakistan
 The Language of the Friday Khutbah
 The Noble Quran: Meaning With Explanatory Notes

Urdu works

 Ahkām-e-Etikāf. Translation is published separately.
 Akabir-e-Deoband Kya Thy?
 Dars Tarmizi
 Fard ki Islāh
 Hadhrat Ameer Mu'awiyah aur Tareekhi Haqa`iq (A critic of Khilafat o Malukiyat)
 Hakeemul Ummat Kay Siyasi Afkar	
 Islāhi Majālis
 Islam aur Jidat Pasandi. English translation is published separately.
 Islam aur Siyasat-e-Hazirah	
 Islam Aur Siyasi Nazriyat
 Ma'asir Hazrat Arifi	
 Maghribi Mumalik Kay Jadeed Fiqhi Masa'il Aur Un Ka Hal
 Nuqoosh-e-Raftigan
 Tauzeeh Al-Qur'an or Aasan Tarjuma-e-Qur'an''' 
 Uloomu-l-Qur'an, Usmāni wrote an introduction to Ma'ariful Qur'an, which he separated and revised later as Uloomu-l-Qur'an. Its English translation has been rendered by Swaleh Siddiqi as An Approach to the Quranic Sciences.
 Taqleed Ki Shari'i Hasiyat. Translation is published separately.
 Taqrīr-e-Tirmizi Zikr-o-Fikr''

References

Bibliography
 
 
 

Islamic studies
Islamic studies books
Lists of books
Bibliographies by writer